The prefrontal scales on snakes and other reptiles are the scales connected to the frontals, towards the tip of the snout, which are in contact with the internasals.

See also
 Snake scales
 Scale (zoology)

References
Wareham DC (2005). Elsevier's Dictionary of Herpetological and Related Terminology.  Amsterdam: Elsevier. 240 pp. . ("PREFRONTAL", p. 160).

Snake scales